Jamal Morrow (born January 24, 1995) is a professional Canadian football running back for the Saskatchewan Roughriders of the Canadian Football League (CFL).

College career 
After using a redshirt season in 2013, Morrow played college football for the Washington State Cougars from 2014 to 2017.

Professional career

Orlando Apollos 
After going unselected in the 2018 NFL Draft, Morrow had tryouts with the Seattle Seahawks and Tampa Bay Buccaneers, but was not signed by a National Football League team. After not playing football in 2018, he signed with the Orlando Apollos for the 2019 season, but was waived during training camp.

Saskatchewan Roughriders 
On April 15, 2019, Morrow signed with the Saskatchewan Roughriders. At the end of the team's 2019 training camp, he was assigned to the practice roster where he remained for the entirety of the season. He was re-signed by the team on November 28, 2019, but did not play in 2020 due to the cancellation of the 2020 CFL season.

In 2021, Morrow again began the year on the practice roster. However, he made his regular season debut on September 5, 2021, in the Labour Day Classic against the Winnipeg Blue Bombers. In that game, he was used as a return specialist where he had four punt returns for 51 yards, four kickoff returns for 73 yards, and two missed field goal returns for 83 yards, including a longest of 73 yards. He had his first start at running back on November 20, 2021, against the Hamilton Tiger-Cats, where he had nine carries for 41 rushing yards and three catches for 29 receiving yards. Morrow played in eight regular season games, primarily as a kick returner, where he had 26 kickoff returns for 586 yards, 30 punt returns for 330 yards, and six missed field goal returns for 206 yards. He scored his first career touchdown in the team's West Semi-Final playoff game, against the Calgary Stampeders, on November 28, 2021, when he returned a punt 69 yards for the score.

After the Roughriders' incumbent starting running back, William Powell, left the team in free agency, Morrow won the job following 2022 training camp. He had his first career 100-yard rushing game when he had 17 carries for 126 yards and one touchdown on June 18, 2022, against the Edmonton Elks. He also had four catches for 28 yards in that game and was named a CFL Top Performer that week. Morrow played in 12 games for the Riders in his second season in the league, carrying the ball 126 times for 666 yards and three touchdowns. He also caught 43 passes for 366 yards with another touchdown. He missed the second half of the season after requiring surgery on a broken hand. Following the season Morrow and the Roughriders agreed to a one-year contract extension.

Personal life 
Morrow was born to parents Vera and Johnnie Morrow. He has one younger brother, Isaiah.

References

External links
 Saskatchewan Roughriders bio

1995 births
Living people
American football running backs
Canadian football running backs
People from Menifee, California
Players of American football from California
Saskatchewan Roughriders players
Washington State Cougars football players